Yes I Can may refer to:
 Yes, I Can, a method for teaching adult literacy
 Yes I Can (TV series), a documentary television series
 "Yes I Can", a 1964 song by Sammy Davis, Jr., from If I Ruled the World
 "Yes, I Can", a 1965 autobiography by Sammy Davis, Jr.

See also
 "Just Say, 'Yes I Can'", a song from Welcome to Pooh Corner
 Oh Yes I Can, a 1989 album by David Crosby
 Yes We Can (disambiguation)